Haroldo de Andrade (May 1, 1934 Curitiba, Brazil - March 1, 2008 Rio de Janeiro) was a Brazilian radio presenter and businessperson.  He was best known for his career at Rede Globo. Andrade died of multiple organ dysfunction syndrome on March 1, 2008, in Rio de Janeiro.

References

1934 births
2008 deaths
Brazilian radio personalities
People from Curitiba
Deaths from multiple organ failure